The following is a list of football stadiums in the Philippines, ordered by capacity. Note that this list includes stadiums that form part of a larger sports complex which don't have a name on their own as well as stadiums named "sports complex" despite not having any auxiliary sports facilities such as a secondary stadium or an indoor arena.

Current stadiums

Stadiums Under Construction

See also
List of indoor arenas in the Philippines
List of baseball stadiums in the Philippines
List of long course swimming pools in the Philippines
List of stadiums in Asia

References

Philippines
stadiums
Football stadium